Swithwulf is an Anglo-Saxon male name borne by several men:

 Swithwulf (bishop of London) (floruit 9th century)
 Swithwulf (bishop of Rochester) (floruit late 9th century)